The 1873 Exeter by-election was held on 9 December 1873, due to the resignation of the incumbent MP of the Liberal Party, John Coleridge, and won by the Conservative candidate, Arthur Mills.

References

1873 elections in the United Kingdom
1873 in England
19th century in Exeter
Elections in Exeter
By-elections to the Parliament of the United Kingdom in Devon constituencies